Liothrips is a genus of thrips with almost 300 described species. They are ordered into three subgenera, Epiliothrips (2 species), Liothrips (262 species) and Zopyrothrips (25 species).

The Clidemia thrips Liothrips urichi is used as a control agent to stop the spread of Clidemia hirta in Hawaii.

Species
Subgenus Epiliothrips Priesner, 1965
Liothrips postocularis
Liothrips willcocksi

Subgenus Liothrips Uzel, 1895

Liothrips aberrans
Liothrips abstrusus
Liothrips acuminatus
Liothrips adisi
Liothrips adusticornis
Liothrips aemulans
Liothrips aequilus
Liothrips aethiops
Liothrips africanus
Liothrips amabilis
Liothrips amoenus
Liothrips ampelopsidis
Liothrips ananthakrishnani
Liothrips annulifer
Liothrips anogeissi
Liothrips anonae
Liothrips antennatus
Liothrips apicatus
Liothrips araliae
Liothrips arrogantis
Liothrips assimulans
Liothrips associatus
Liothrips ater
Liothrips atratus
Liothrips atricapillus
Liothrips atricolor
Liothrips avocadis
Liothrips aztecus
Liothrips baccati
Liothrips badius
Liothrips barronis
Liothrips bibbyi
Liothrips bireni
Liothrips bispinosus
Liothrips bomiensis
Liothrips bondari
Liothrips bosei
Liothrips bournieri
Liothrips bournierorum
Liothrips brasiliensis
Liothrips brevicollis
Liothrips brevicornis
Liothrips brevifemur
Liothrips brevitubus
Liothrips brevitubus
Liothrips brevitubus
Liothrips buffae
Liothrips capnodes
Liothrips caryae
Liothrips castaneae
Liothrips cecidii
Liothrips champakae
Liothrips chavicae
Liothrips chinensis
Liothrips citricornis
Liothrips citricornis
Liothrips clarus
Liothrips cognatus
Liothrips colimae
Liothrips collustratus
Liothrips condei
Liothrips confusus
Liothrips convergens
Liothrips cordiae
Liothrips corni
Liothrips crassipes
Liothrips cunctans
Liothrips cuspidatae
Liothrips debilis
Liothrips dentifer
Liothrips devriesi
Liothrips didymopanicis
Liothrips digressus
Liothrips dissochaetae
Liothrips distinctus
Liothrips diwasabiae
Liothrips dumosus
Liothrips dux
Liothrips elaeocarpi
Liothrips elatostemae
Liothrips emulatus
Liothrips epacrus
Liothrips epimeralis
Liothrips eremicus
Liothrips errabundus
Liothrips euryae
Liothrips exiguus
Liothrips exilis
Liothrips fagraeae
Liothrips flavescens
Liothrips flavipes
Liothrips flavitibia
Liothrips floridensis
Liothrips fluggeae
Liothrips fragilis
Liothrips fraudulentus
Liothrips fulmekianus
Liothrips fumicornis
Liothrips fungi
Liothrips furvus
Liothrips fuscus
Liothrips gaviotae
Liothrips genualis
Liothrips glycinicola
Liothrips gymnosporiae
Liothrips gynopogoni
Liothrips hagai
Liothrips heptapleurinus
Liothrips himalayanus
Liothrips horutonoki
Liothrips hyalinipennis
Liothrips ilex
Liothrips indicus
Liothrips infrequens
Liothrips inquilinus
Liothrips insidiosus
Liothrips interlocatus
Liothrips invisus
Liothrips jakhontovi
Liothrips jazykovi
Liothrips jogensis
Liothrips kannani
Liothrips karnyi
Liothrips kingi
Liothrips kolliensis
Liothrips kurosawai
Liothrips kusunoki
Liothrips kuwanai
Liothrips kuwayamai
Liothrips laingi
Liothrips laureli
Liothrips lepidus
Liothrips leucopus
Liothrips litsaeae
Liothrips longiceps
Liothrips longicornis
Liothrips longitubus
Liothrips loranthi
Liothrips luzonensis
Liothrips macgregori
Liothrips machilus
Liothrips major
Liothrips malabaricus
Liothrips matudai
Liothrips mayumi
Liothrips melanarius
Liothrips mendesi
Liothrips mexicanus
Liothrips mikaniae
Liothrips miniati
Liothrips minys
Liothrips mirabilis
Liothrips miyatakei
Liothrips miyazakii
Liothrips mohanrami
Liothrips monae
Liothrips monoensis
Liothrips monsterae
Liothrips montanus
Liothrips morindae
Liothrips morulus
Liothrips moultoni
Liothrips mucronis
Liothrips muralii
Liothrips muscorum
Liothrips nanus
Liothrips neosmerinthi
Liothrips nigriculus
Liothrips nubilis
Liothrips obscurus
Liothrips ocellatus
Liothrips oculatus
Liothrips oleae
Liothrips omphalopinus
Liothrips orchidis
Liothrips palasae
Liothrips pallicornis
Liothrips pallicrus
Liothrips pallipes
Liothrips parcus
Liothrips penetralis
Liothrips perandaphaga
Liothrips perseae
Liothrips peruviensis
Liothrips piger
Liothrips piperinus
Liothrips pistaciae
Liothrips polybotryae
Liothrips polyosminus
Liothrips praelongus
Liothrips pragensis
Liothrips priesneri
Liothrips pruni
Liothrips querci
Liothrips ramakrishnae
Liothrips raoensis
Liothrips rectigenis
Liothrips renukae
Liothrips retrofracti
Liothrips retusus
Liothrips reynvaanae
Liothrips rhaphidophorae
Liothrips rohdeae
Liothrips rostratus
Liothrips rubiae
Liothrips russelli
Liothrips salti
Liothrips sambuci
Liothrips sangali
Liothrips sanxianensis
Liothrips sarmentosi
Liothrips satanas
Liothrips scotti
Liothrips seshadrii
Liothrips seticollis
Liothrips setinodis
Liothrips shii
Liothrips shishiudo
Liothrips sibajakensis
Liothrips silvestrii
Liothrips similis
Liothrips sinarundinariae
Liothrips smeeanus
Liothrips soembanus
Liothrips soror
Liothrips striaticeps
Liothrips styracinus
Liothrips suavis
Liothrips sulcifrons
Liothrips tabascensis
Liothrips takahashii
Liothrips tandiliensis
Liothrips tarsidens
Liothrips tenuicornis
Liothrips tenuis
Liothrips terminaliae
Liothrips tersus
Liothrips tertius
Liothrips tessariae
Liothrips tibialis
Liothrips tridentatus
Liothrips tropicus
Liothrips tsutsumii
Liothrips tupac
Liothrips turkestanicus
Liothrips umbripennis
Liothrips unicolor
Liothrips urichi
Liothrips usitatus
Liothrips vaneeckei
Liothrips variabilis
Liothrips varicornis
Liothrips vernoniae
Liothrips versicolor
Liothrips vichitravarna
Liothrips vigilax
Liothrips wangjinensis
Liothrips wasabiae
Liothrips wittmeri
Liothrips xanthocerus
Liothrips zeteki

Subgenus Zopyrothrips Priesner, 1968

Liothrips astutus
Liothrips claripennis
Liothrips comparandus
Liothrips extractus
Liothrips fumipennis
Liothrips heptapleuri
Liothrips heptapleuricola
Liothrips ingratus
Liothrips jacobsoni
Liothrips latro
Liothrips litoralis
Liothrips macropanacis
Liothrips maximus
Liothrips nervisequus
Liothrips nigripes
Liothrips praetermissus
Liothrips racemosae
Liothrips schefflerae
Liothrips simillimus
Liothrips sordidus
Liothrips spectabilis
Liothrips taurus
Liothrips tetrastigmae
Liothrips viticola
Liothrips vitivorus

References
 Thrips of the World Checklist: Genus Liothrips

Thrips genera
Phlaeothripidae